Maple Heights High School is a public high school located in Maple Heights, Ohio, southeast of Cleveland, Ohio. It graduated its first class in 1925. It was the first high school in America to offer a credit class in popular culture studies, created in 1975. It also offered a broadcast journalism class, Television Journalism, which produced a long-running public-access television cable TV program entitled Maple Schools Today, which ran on several Cleveland Ohio cable outlets from 1984 through 2002.

A completely new high school building opened in 2013, replacing one that dated back 90 years. A new stadium with artificial turf and an all-weather track opened in 2014.

Athletics
Maple Heights High School athletics is best known for the success of the boys' wrestling teams.  They won 10 state championships in a 19-year period from 1956–1974.  They were led by legendary coach Mike Milkovich.  Milkovich played a role in a sports brawl that led eventually to a U.S. Supreme Court case, Milkovich v. Lorain Journal Co., an important free speech case.

The team nickname is the Mustangs.

Ohio High School Athletic Association State Championships

 Wrestling – 1956, 1957, 1962, 1963, 1966, 1967, 1968, 1969, 1971, 1974 
 Football – 2010

Notable alumni

Chuck Findley – Class of 1965. trumpet player in The Tonight Show Band, Steely Dan and The Wrecking Crew.
Bruce E. Grooms – retired vice admiral in the United States Navy.
Len Kosmalski, NBA basketball player (Kansas City Kings)
Jim Krusoe, novelist, poet, and short story writer.
Frank Mestnik (born 1938), class of 1953, professional football player (St. Louis Cardinals and Green Bay Packers).
Dale Mohorcic, class of 1974, professional baseball player
Ric Ocasek (1944–2019), class of 1963, lead singer of the Cars.
Mary Oliver – Pulitzer Prize and American Book Award winning poet.
Richard Quinn (born 1986), professional football player (Denver Broncos and Washington Redskins).
Evelyn Svec Ward (1921–1989), class of 1939, fiber artist.

Notes and references

External links 
 

High schools in Cuyahoga County, Ohio
Public high schools in Ohio